Lågendalen is a valley located in eastern Norway.
 
Lågendalen forms the lower part of the valley through which the Numedalslågen flows between Kongsberg in Buskerud and Larvik in Vestfold.  North of Kongsberg, the valley is known as Numedal. 
Lågendalen includes parts of the municipalities of Larvik, Lardal and Kongsberg.  The valley is relatively flat, characterized by farmland and wooded hills. Lågendalen is most commonly known for potato cultivation and salmon fishing. 
Lågendalen is also the location of several Medieval era stone churches: Hedrum Church, Hem Church, Efteløt Church and Hedenstad Church.

Gallery

References

Valleys of Viken
Valleys of Vestfold og Telemark
Kongsberg
Larvik